Genovesi is a surname of Italian origin. It is the plural form of Genovese, stemming from old Italian usage of "dei Genovesi" as a family name, meaning "of the Genoveses". Notable people with this name include:

 Alessandro Genovesi (born 1973), Italian director, screenwriter, playwright and actor
 Anthony J. Genovesi (1936–1998), New York politician
 Antonio Genovesi (1713–1769), Italian writer on philosophy and political economy
 Judi Genovesi (born 1957), American ice dancer
 Maura Genovesi (born 1973), Italian sport shooter
 Patrizia Genovesi (born 1962), Italian photographer and video artist
 Pietro Genovesi (1902–1980), Italian football player

See also
 Genovese
 Genoese (disambiguation)

Italian-language surnames
Italian toponymic surnames